A DVD program is an entity in the navigational structure of a disc's digital data. It is an 8 bit pointer in a program chain (PGC) to a group of cells (the basic units of video playback). DVD programs define the order in which cells are played back and will reflect user selections for playback.

For instance, multi-angle scenes can be shown through a branch in the program chain, as the DVD is being played, to the video cells for the other angles. Subtitles as well are also sometimes run through branches in program chains.

Because the order in which cells are to be played is not necessarily the order in which the cells are found on the disc (this is especially true for commercially produced DVDs), programs are required for intelligible playback. At the consumer level, however, DVDs created by most authoring tools are simpler, and have only one program per chapter.

Some commercial DVDs may have a large number of program chains which point to the same set of cells, which may confuse some ripping software into believing that the disc has more than 9 gigabytes of data.

Remote buttons 'next' and 'previous' navigate programs. Another example of a program chain is the first-play PGC. When a disc is first inserted into a DVD player, the first-play PGC is run. Most commercial DVDs use the first-play PGC to check for region, display warning screens, or other short video (such as anti-piracy videos), before transferring the playback to a title in the VTS Domain (Video Title Set) or a menu in the VTSM Domain (Video Title Set Menu).

DVD